Typically, a jail or prison.

Justice Center or Justice Centre may refer to:

Justice Centre Leoben, Styria, Austria
Justice Centre for Constitutional Freedoms, Calgary, Alberta, Canada
Hamilton County Justice Center, Cincinnati, Ohio, United States
Justice Center, Asheville, North Carolina, United States
Justice Center Complex, Cleveland, Ohio, United States
Multnomah County Justice Center, Portland, Oregon, United States

See also